Middle of the Night is a 1959 film based on the play.

Middle of the Night may also refer to:

 "Middle of the Night" (The Vamps and Martin Jensen song), 2017
 "Middle of the Night" (Elley Duhé song), 2020
 "Middle of the Night", a song by Amy Shark from the 2018 album Love Monster
 "Middle of the Night", a song by Brotherhood of Man from the 1978 album Higher Than High
 "Middle of the Night", a song by Monsta X from the 2020 album All About Luv
 Middle of the Night, a 1954 play by Paddy Chayefsky
 "Middle of the Night", a 1952 B-side to "One Mint Julep", by the Clovers

Other uses
 Middle-of-the-night insomnia, a medical condition

See also
 Midnight (disambiguation)
 In the Middle of the Night (disambiguation)